Hålandsosen is a village in Suldal municipality in Rogaland county, Norway. The Norwegian National Road 13 runs through the village, and the Erfjord Bridge lies just north of the village. It is the only bridge over the Erfjorden.

The village was the administrative centre of the old municipality of Erfjord, which existed from 1914 until 1965.  The village is the site of the Erfjord Church.

References

Villages in Rogaland
Suldal